The Order of the Day  is a novel by the French writer Éric Vuillard. In French it is described as a récit, while The Guardian described it as an historical essay with literary flourishes.

The book received the Prix Goncourt.

Content 
The action of the book takes place during the time between the rise to power of the German Nazi party (chapter: A secret meeting),  and the Anschluss (chapter: Interview at the Berghof and  The art of indecision).

See also
 2017 in literature
 Contemporary French literature

References

2017 French novels
French-language novels
French historical novels
Prix Goncourt winning works
Actes Sud books